Commissioned officers' and Enlisted rank comparison chart of all marine forces.

Officers (OF 1–10)

Warrant officers (WO 1-5) 
Warrant Officers (WO) and Chief Warrant Officers (CWO) in the US Military rank below officers but above officer candidates and enlisted servicemen. The first warrant officer rank, WO1 does not have a "commission" associated with it, instead having a "Warrant" from the Secretary of the Army. Warrant officers are allowed the same courtesies as a commissioned officer, but may have some restrictions on their duties that are reserved for commissioned officers. Warrant officers usually receive a commission once they are promoted to Chief Warrant Officer 2 (CW2), but are usually not referred to as "commissioned officers". WO1s may be and sometimes are appointed by commission as stated in title 10USC.

Enlisted (OR 1–9)

See also 
 Ranks and insignia of NATO
 Ranks and insignia of NATO armies enlisted
 Ranks and insignia of NATO armies officers
 Ranks and insignia of NATO air forces enlisted
 Ranks and insignia of NATO air forces officers
 Ranks and insignia of NATO navies enlisted
 Ranks and insignia of NATO navies officers

Notes

References 

 

 
 

Military comparisons